Events in the year 1901 in Norway.

Incumbents
Monarch: Oscar II
Prime Minister: Johannes Steen

Events
12 August – 2/3 of the town of Farsund burns down.

Popular culture

Sports

Music

Film

Literature

Births

January to March
9 January – Bjarne Lyngstad, politician and Minister (died 1971)
16 January – Narve Bonna, ski jumper and Olympic silver medallist (died 1976)
16 January – Hans Karolus Ommedal, politician (died 1984)
26 January – Alf Konningen, alpine skier (died 1978)
30 January – Eldrid Erdal, politician (died 1997)
21 February – Tore Foss, singer, actor and theatre director (died 1968).
11 March – Kjell Bondevik, politician and Minister (died 1983)
17 March – Arnt Njargel, politician (died 1985)
25 March – Harry Lundeberg, merchant seaman and labour leader in America (died 1957)

April to June
10 April – Tønnes Oksefjell, politician (died 1976)
23 April – Tore Segelcke, actress (died 1979)
1 May – Jentoft Jensen, politician (died 1953)
3 May – Kjell Gjøstein Aabrek, politician (died 1967)
8 May – Ingrid Bjerkås, first female minister in the Church of Norway (died 1980)
11 May – Axel Strøm, physician (died 1985).
23 May – Kristoffer Nilsen, boxer (died 1975)
4 June – Kolbjørn Fjeld, librarian and publisher (died 1978).
7 June – Nils Ebbessøn Astrup, ship owner (died 1972).
19 June – Øyvinn Øi, military officer (died 1940)

July to September
8 July – Sigurd Lersbryggen, politician (died 1980)
9 July – Jørgen Mathiesen, landowner and businessperson (died 1993)
14 July – Hårek Ludvig Hansen, politician (died 1996)
14 July – Haakon Sløgedal, politician (died 1979)
17 July – Finn Berstad, international soccer player (died 1982)
6 August – Anders Sæterøy, politician (died 1991)
10 August – Hjalmar Olai Storeide, politician (died 1961)
14 August – Håkon Bryhn, sailor and Olympic gold medallist (died 1968)
16 August – Olav Kielland, composer and conductor (died 1985)
27 August – Liv Tomter, politician (died 1978)
31 August – Helge Jakobsen, politician (died 1996)
5 September – Erling Dekke Næss, shipowner and businessman (died 1993)
6 September – Henrik Friis Robberstad, politician (died 1978)
11 September – Torkell Tande, politician (died 2001)
22 September – Brynhild Berge, diver (died 1975)

October to December
1 October – Arne Torolf Strøm, politician (died 1972)
2 October – Egil Halmøy, politician (died 1984)
4 October – Egil Werner Erichsen, politician (died 2000)
6 October – Aslak Brekke, folksinger (died 1978)
8 October – Eivind Groven, composer and music-theorist (died 1977)
18 November – Einar Nilsen, boxer (died 1980)
24 November – Reidar Ødegaard, cross country skier and Olympic bronze medallist (died 1972)
6 December – Odd Nansen, architect, author and humanitarian (died 1973)
26 December – Olav Hordvik, politician (died 1979)
31 December – John Schjelderup Giæver, author and polar researcher (died 1970)

Full date unknown
Per Arneberg, poet, prosaist and translator (died 1981)
Erik Kristen-Johanssen, jurist and theatre director (died 1976)
Gulbrand Lunde, politician (died 1942)
Rudolf Nilsen, poet and journalist (died 1929)
Bjarne Slapgard, educator and author (died 1997)
Solveig Haugan,  stage and movie actress (died 1953)

Deaths
31 January – Peter Andreas Blix, architect and engineer (born 1831)
9 May – Andreas Leigh Aabel, physician and poet (born 1830)
3 July – Lorenz Juhl Vogt, politician (born 1825)

Full date unknown
Ole Peter Petersen, founder of Methodism in Norway and co-founder of Norwegian and Danish Methodism in the United States (born 1822)

See also

References